Unfabulous and More is the debut and only soundtrack album for the television series Unfabulous, performed by American actress and singer Emma Roberts. It was released on September 27, 2005.

The album contains songs from the show's first season, as well as several new songs. The tracks "I Wanna Be" and "Dummy" were both released as singles. The song "Mexican Wrestler", which was sung by Emma in the episode "The 66th Day", was originally on Jill Sobule's 2000 album Pink Pearl.

This album was one of the 52 from Sony BMG that were on the company's list of CDs shipped with the computer software known as Extended Copy Protection (XCP), as well as the only Nickelodeon-related CD originally shipped with the software. As a result, any Microsoft Windows computer that has been used to play this CD is likely to have had XCP installed. This can cause a number of serious security problems. Several security software vendors, including Microsoft, regard XCP as a trojan horse, spyware, or rootkit. Sony discontinued use of the technology on November 11, 2005, and recalled this and other titles affected by XCP, and asked customers to submit copies affected by the software to the company so that it could replace them with copies that did not contain the software.

Track listing
 "I Wanna Be" 
 "Punch Rocker" (Jill Sobule) – 2:33
 "Say Goodbye to Jr. High" (Anjulie Persaud) – 3:39
 "I Have Arrived" (Jeannie Lurie, Holly Mathis, Lindsay Sorensen, Christopher Sorensen) – 3:23
 "94 Weeks (Metal Mouth Freak)" (Sobule) – 3:49
 "This Is Me" (Marshall Altman, Emma Roberts, Erin Workman) – 3:40
 "Dummy" (Franne Golde, Kasia Livingston, Andrew Williams) – 3:08
 "Mexican Wrestler" (Robin Eaton, Sobule) – 5:02
 "We Are Gonna Happen" (Dave Derby, Colleen Fitzpatrick, Michael Kotch) – 3:35
 "New Shoes" (Sue Rose, Sobule) – 2:16
 "Look in the Mirror" Bonus Track – Limited Too Package – 1:05

Personnel
 Paul Bushnell – bass
 Julian Coryell – guitar
 Dorian Crozier – drums
 Zach Danziger – percussions
 Nick Dimichino – bass
 Dean Drouilliard – guitars
 John Hampson – guitars
 Keely Hawkes-Pressly – background vocals
 Daniel Holter – keys
 Sean Hurley – bass
 Jon Levine – piano, keyboards
 Gabriel Mann – keyboards
 Jim McGorman – keys
 Dino Meneghin – guitar
 Samantha Murphy – background vocals
 Yurko Mychaluk – guitars
 Lee Nadel – bass
 Anjulie Persaud – background vocals, percussion
 Marc Rogers – bass
 Jill Sobule – acoustic guitar, background vocals
 Lindsay Sorensen – background vocals
 Michael Standal – electric guitar
 Aaron Sterling – drums
 Vince Tattanelli – drums
 Denton Whited – drums
 Erin Wirkman – background vocals

Chart performance

Notes

External links
 Emma Roberts' official music site (including audio and music video streams)
 Emma Roberts' Unfabulous: The Soundtrack clip (with demo version of "I Wanna Be" and alternate album track listing)

2005 debut albums
Emma Roberts albums
Television soundtracks
Albums produced by Marshall Altman
2005 soundtrack albums
Columbia Records soundtracks